The 2020–21 Football League Greece was the second season as a third-tier professional league of the Greek football league system since its restructuring and the tenth season under the name Football League after previously being known as Beta Ethniki. That was the first season after 2014–15 that the league has more than one groups. The groups are created based on geographical criteria. That was the last season of the league before their abolishment and a merger with Super League Greece 2, as a result of a new restructuring of the Greek league system. The 2020-21 season start has been delayed due to the COVID-19 second lockdown in Greece that began in November 2020.

North Group

Teams

Personnel and sponsoring

League table

Results

South Group

Teams

Personnel and sponsoring

League table

Results

References

3
Third level Greek football league seasons
Greece
Greece 3